Cryptandra pogonoloba is a species of flowering plant in the family Rhamnaceae and is endemic to south-eastern Queensland. It is a shrub with linear to lance-shaped leaves with the narrower end towards the base, and white to creamy-white, tube-shaped flowers.

Description
The lower surface of the leaves is densely hairy, or concealed. The flowers are borne singly in leaf axils with 4 to 9 brown bracts at the base. The petals are white, protrude  beyond the sepal tube, and form a hood over the stamens.

Taxonomy and naming
Cryptandra pogonoloba was first formally described in 2004 by Anthony Bean in the journal Austrobaileya from specimens collected in Bulleringa National Park in 1998. The specific epithet (pogonoloba) refers to the usual shape of the leaves.

In 2006, Jürgen Kellerman described two subspecies of C. pogonoloba in the journal Muelleria, and the names are accepted by the Australian Plant Census:

Distribution and habitat
Subspecies pogonoloba grows in sandy soil on sandstone in woodland from the Windsor Tablelands and Daintree National Park to the Gregory Range and subsp. septentrionalis grows in heath, shrubland and open woodland and is only known from between the Pascoe River and Kutini-Payamu (Iron Range) National Park in far north Queensland.

References

pogonoloba
Rosales of Australia
Flora of Queensland
Plants described in 2004
Taxa named by Anthony Bean